The 2003 First-Year Player Draft, Major League Baseball's annual amateur draft, was held on June 3 and 4.  It was conducted via conference call with representatives from each of the league's 30 teams.

Source:  MLB.com 2003 Draft Tracker

First round selections

Supplemental first round selections

Compensation Picks

Other notable players

Tony Gwynn Jr., 2nd round, 39th overall by the Milwaukee Brewers
Tom Gorzelanny, 2nd round, 45th overall by the Pittsburgh Pirates
Ryan Sweeney, 2nd round, 52nd overall by the Chicago White Sox
Scott Baker, 2nd round, 58th overall by the Minnesota Twins
Andre Ethier, 2nd round, 62nd overall by the Oakland Athletics
Chris Ray, 3rd round, 74th overall by the Baltimore Orioles
Shaun Marcum, 3rd round, 80th overall by the Toronto Blue Jays
Drew Stubbs, 3rd round, 89th overall by the Houston Astros, but did not sign
Matt Harrison, 3rd round, 97th overall by the Atlanta Braves
Jonathan Papelbon, 4th round, 114th overall by the Boston Red Sox
Michael Bourn, 4th round, 115th overall by the Philadelphia Phillies
Sean Marshall, 6th round, 163rd overall by the Chicago Cubs
Kevin Kouzmanoff, 6th round, 168th overall by the Cleveland Indians
Eric O'Flaherty, 6th round, 176th overall by the Seattle Mariners
Matt Kemp, 6th round, 181st overall by the Los Angeles Dodgers
Mike Avilés, 7th round, 192nd overall by the Kansas City Royals
Brian Bannister, 7th round, 199th overall by the New York Mets
Kyle Kendrick, 7th round, 205th overall by the Philadelphia Phillies
Brendan Ryan, 7th round, 215th overall by the St. Louis Cardinals
Tyler Clippard, 9th round, 274th overall by the New York Yankees
Casey McGehee, 10th round, 283rd overall by the Chicago Cubs
John Jaso, 12th round, 338th overall by the Tampa Bay Devil Rays
Matt LaPorta, 14th round, 403rd overall by the Chicago Cubs, but did not sign
Mike Dunn, 14th round, 419th overall by the Houston Astros, but did not sign
Ian Kennedy, 14th round, 425th overall by the St. Louis Cardinals, but did not sign
Aaron Laffey, 16th round, 468th overall by the Cleveland Indians
Ian Kinsler, 17th round, 496th overall by the Texas Rangers
Ryan Roberts, 18th round, 530th overall by the Toronto Blue Jays
Chris Coghlan, 18th round, 546th overall by the Arizona Diamondbacks, but did not sign
Jason Motte, 19th round, 575th overall by the St. Louis Cardinals
Brad Ziegler, 20th round, 595th overall by the Philadelphia Phillies
Daniel Bard, 20th round, 604th overall by the New York Yankees, but did not sign
Tony Watson, 23rd round, 683rd overall by the Florida Marlins, but did not sign
Sam Fuld, 24th round, 703rd overall by the Chicago Cubs, but did not sign
Brian Wilson, 24th round, 723rd overall by the San Francisco Giants
Brad Lincoln, 28th round, 826th overall by the Texas Rangers, but did not sign
David Hernandez, 29th round, 857th overall by the Colorado Rockies, but did not sign
Scott Feldman, 30th round, 886th overall by the Texas Rangers
Jonny Venters, 30th round, 907th overall by the Atlanta Braves
Wade LeBlanc, 36th round, 1058th overall by the Tampa Bay Devil Rays, but did not sign
Logan Ondrusek, 36th round, 1079th overall by the Houston Astros, but did not sign
Kris Medlen, 37th round, 1088th overall by the Tampa Bay Devil Rays, but did not sign
Jesse Litsch, 37th round, 1097th overall by the Colorado Rockies, but did not sign
Andy LaRoche, 39th round, 1171st overall by the Los Angeles Dodgers
Brandon Morrow, 40th round, 1200th overall by the Anaheim Angels, but did not sign
Jim Adduci, 42nd round, 1252nd overall by the Florida Marlins
Max Scherzer, 43rd round, 1291st overall by the St. Louis Cardinals, but did not sign
Steve Pearce, 45th round, 1341st overall by the Minnesota Twins, but did not sign
Tim Lincecum, 48th round, 1408th overall by the Chicago Cubs, but did not sign
Casey Janssen, 49th round, 1435th overall by the Baltimore Orioles, but did not sign
Doug Fister, 49th round, 1451st overall by the San Francisco Giants, but did not sign

NFL players drafted
Chaz Schilens, 34th round, 1000th overall by the Detroit Tigers, but did not sign

Background
The Tampa Bay Devil Rays selected Camarillo High School outfielder Delmon Young with the first overall pick.

Young (6-3, 205 pounds) batted .541 (33-for-61) with seven home runs, 28 RBI in 22 games as a senior this spring for Camarillo. He was named Baseball America's High School Player of the Year in 2002 and was one of only three juniors selected as first team 2002 All-Americans. He became the first junior to be named California State Player of the Year since Eric Chavez in 1995.

At the World Junior Championships in Sherbrooke, Quebec, he helped lead Team USA to a bronze medal while batting .513 with a tournament-record eight home runs and 19 RBI in 38 at-bats.

Young is the younger brother of retired MLB player Dmitri Young, who was an expansion draft pick of the Rays, but never played in the organization. They became the first set of brothers to be taken within the first five selections of the draft. Dmitri was the 4th player selected by the Cardinals in the 1991 draft.

Pitchers Ryan Wagner (Cincinnati), Chad Cordero (Montreal), David Aardsma (San Francisco) and infielder Rickie Weeks (Milwaukee) all reached the Major League level in less than a year.

Chad Cordero was the first 2003 draftee to be selected to an All-Star Game, selected in 2005. Abe Alvarez, drafted in the 2nd round, was the first 2003 draftee to win a World Series championship, although he was not on the 2004 Boston Red Sox postseason roster. Anthony Reyes, drafted in the 15th round, was the first to be on a winning World Series roster.

The Atlanta Braves selected Rick Sporcic SS Highlands HS (PA)  Round 50 Draft #1480 with the final pick of the 2003 MLB Draft.
2x Cy Young Award winner Tim Lincecum was drafted by the Chicago Cubs in the forty-eighth round (1,408 pick)

External links
MLB.com - 2003 Draft page
MLB.com - Draft History
Complete draft list from The Baseball Cube database

References

Major League Baseball draft
Draft
Major League Baseball draft